Radial, Inc. is an American multinational e-commerce company based in King of Prussia, Pennsylvania. It provides order management, payment processing, order routing, fulfillment, and analytics services for companies such as GameStop, DSW, Shoe Carnival and Destination XL.

History
Radial was formed from the merger of Innotrac Corporation and the enterprise services unit of eBay Enterprise.

Merger

Sterling Partners, a private equity firm, acquired Innotrac on January 6, 2014, for $8.20 per share. The buyout totaled $108 million. Innotrac provided customer support and fulfillment services to retailers, software providers, and telecommunications companies.

On November 2, 2015, Sterling Partners acquired eBay Enterprise's operations and enterprise technology services division. Sterling Partners planned to merge Innotrac and the group from eBay Enterprise.

The combined company, Radial, was announced on April 19, 2016. Sterling Partners estimated Radial's initial value at more than $1 billion.

Bpost

In October 2017, the Belgian Post Group, also known as bpost, acquired Radial for $820 million.

References 

Companies based in Montgomery County, Pennsylvania
Online companies of the United States
Privately held companies based in Pennsylvania
American companies established in 2016
2016 establishments in Pennsylvania
2016 mergers and acquisitions
2017 mergers and acquisitions
American subsidiaries of foreign companies